Tiago Alexandre Sousa Esgaio (born 1 August 1995) is a Portuguese professional footballer who plays for F.C. Arouca on loan from S.C. Braga as a midfielder and a right-back.

Club career

Belenenses
Born in Nazaré, Leiria District, played youth football for three clubs. He made his senior debut in the third division, spending one season apiece with Caldas S.C. and S.C.U. Torreense.

On 4 April 2018, Esgaio moved straight to the Primeira Liga after signing a three-year contract with Belenenses SAD to be made effective on 1 July. He was then loaned to Torreense for the upcoming third-tier campaign.

Back at Belenenses, Esgaio played his first match in the Portuguese top flight on 15 September 2019, coming on as a late substitute in a 3–1 away win against C.S. Marítimo. He scored his first goal in the competition two weeks later, but in a 3–1 loss at F.C. Famalicão.

Braga
On 23 June 2021, Esgaio joined S.C. Braga on a four-year deal. Only two months later, however, he was loaned to F.C. Arouca also of the top tier for the season; the move was extended for 2022–23.

Personal life
Esgaio's older brother, Ricardo, is also a footballer.

References

External links

1995 births
Living people
People from Nazaré, Portugal
Sportspeople from Leiria District
Portuguese footballers
Association football defenders
Association football midfielders
Primeira Liga players
Campeonato de Portugal (league) players
Caldas S.C. players
S.C.U. Torreense players
Belenenses SAD players
S.C. Braga players
F.C. Arouca players